Julien Verdier (13 January 1910 - 15 July 1999) was a French actor. He appeared in more than one hundred films from 1949 to 1994.

Filmography

References

External links 

1910 births
1999 deaths
French male film actors